Nauru was represented at the 1990 Commonwealth Games in Auckland by a single athlete, weightlifter Marcus Stephen, who would later become his country's President in 2007. The 1990 Games marked Nauru's first participation in the Commonwealth Games. Stephen competed in three events only, and won medals in all three, including one gold.

Medals

Gold
 Marcus Stephen, Weightlifting, Men's 60 kg Snatch

Silver
 Marcus Stephen, Weightlifting, Men's 60 kg Clean and Jerk
 Marcus Stephen, Weightlifting, Men's 62 kg Combined

Bronze
none

Sources
 Official results

Sport in Nauru
Nauru at the Commonwealth Games
Nations at the 1990 Commonwealth Games
1990 in Nauruan sport